Cedar Creek is a stream in the U.S. state of Nebraska. It is a tributary to the Platte River.

Cedar Creek was named for the cedar timber lining its banks.

References

Rivers of Cass County, Nebraska
Rivers of Nebraska